Lilioid monocots (lilioids, liliid monocots, petaloid monocots, petaloid lilioid monocots) is an informal name used for a grade (grouping of taxa with common characteristics) of five monocot orders (Petrosaviales, Dioscoreales, Pandanales, Liliales and Asparagales) in which the majority of species have flowers with relatively large, coloured tepals. This characteristic is similar to that found in lilies ("lily-like"). Petaloid monocots refers to the flowers having tepals which all resemble petals (petaloid). The taxonomic terms Lilianae or Liliiflorae have also been applied to this assemblage at various times. From the early nineteenth century many of the species in this group of plants were put into a very broadly defined family, Liliaceae sensu lato or s.l. (lily family). These classification systems are still found in many books and other sources. Within the monocots the Liliaceae s.l. were distinguished from the Glumaceae.

The development of molecular phylogenetics, cladistic theory and phylogenetic methods in the 1990s resulted in a dismemberment of the Liliaceae and its subsequent redistribution across three lilioid orders (Liliales, Asparagales and Dioscoreales). Subsequent work has shown that two other more recently recognized orders, Petrosaviales and Pandanales also segregate with this group, resulting in the modern concept of five constituent orders within the lilioid monocot assemblage. This has resulted in treating monocots as three informal groups, alismatid, lilioid and commelinid monocots. The lilioids are paraphyletic in the sense that commelinids form a sister group to Asparagales.

Description

True lilioids 
The descriptive term "petaloid lilioid monocot" relates to the conspicuous petal-like (petaloid) tepals which superficially resemble true lilies (Lilium). Morphologically, the petaloid or lilioid monocots can be considered to possess five groups (pentacyclic) of three-fold (trimerous) whorls. Lilioid monocots all have flowers which can be considered to have been derived from a lily-like flower with six relatively similar tepals, and six stamens. The typical lilioid gynoecium has
three carpels fused into a superior trilocular (three-chambered) superior ovary, axile placentation, a single hollow style, and several ovules with anatropous orientation in one or two rows per locule and nectaries at the base.

However, floral synapomorphy (shared characteristics) is rare since most conform to the general monocot pattern. This pattern is ancestral (plesiomorphic) for the lilioid monocots. Structural monosymmetry is rare, except for Orchidaceae.

Various trends are apparent among the lilioids, notably a change to an inferior ovary and a reduction of the number of stamens to three. In some groups (such as the genus Trillium in the Liliaceae), the tepals have become clearly differentiated so that the flower has three coloured petals and three smaller green sepals. Almost all lilioid monocots retain at least three petal-like tepals. Since some commelinids (e.g., Palisota in the Commelinaceae, Haemodoraceae, Philydraceae, and Pontederiaceae) have petaloid flowers, the term 'lilioid' is a more accurate one for the group which excludes them, since the term petaloid monocot is still occasionally used in describing commelinids. The morphological concept of petaloid monocots has been equated with "animal-attracting" (that is, for pollination) as opposed to wind-pollinating plants (such as grasses) that have evolved very different floral structures. Pollen structure shows that of the two main tapetum types, secretory and plasmodial, the lilioid monocots are nearly all secretory.

Comparison with other monocot orders 
In the orders that branched off before the lilioid monocots, the Acorales and Alismatales, flowers differ in several ways. In some cases, like Acorus (Acorales), they have become insignificant. In others, like Butomus (Alismatales), they have six coloured tepals, and so could be called 'petaloid', but stamens and carpels are more numerous than in the lilioid monocots.

The later evolved commelinids have various kinds of flower, few of which are 'lily-like'. In the order Poales, comprising grasses, rushes and sedges, flowers are either petal-less or have small, unshowy petals. Many Zingiberales species have brightly coloured and showy flowers. However, their apparent structure is misleading. For example, the six tepals of cannas are small and hidden under expanded and brightly coloured stamens or staminodes which resemble petals and may be mistaken for them.

Taxonomy

Early history 

In one of the earliest monocot taxonomies, that of John Lindley (1830), the grouping corresponding to the lilioid monocots was the "tribe" Petaloideae. In Lindley's system the monocots consisted of two tribes, the Petaloideae, and the Glumaceae (the grasses and sedges). Lindley divided the Petaloideae into 32 "orders" (roughly corresponding to  families) and the Glumaceae into two further orders. Various successive taxonomies of the monocots also emphasized the grouping of species with petaloid (undifferentiated) perianths, such as Bentham and Hooker's Coronarieæ and Hutchinson's Corolliferae ("Corolla bearing") (1936). Hence the concept that there was a natural grouping of monocots whose flowers were predominantly petaloid, gave notion to the term "petaloid monocots". The core group of petaloids were the Liliaceae, hence "lilioid monocots".

The term "lilioid monocot" or lilioid" has had widely varying interpretations. One of the narrower applications is "lily-like" monocots, meaning the two orders Asparagales and Liliales, but the term has also been applied to Takhtajan's superorder Lilianae, the whole of Liliales, or restricted to Cronquist's broadly defined Liliaceae. Although "petaloid" and "lilioid" have often been used interchangeably, as Heywood points out, some usages of "petaloid monocot", particularly in horticulture, are so broad as to be almost meaningless in that it had been used to refer to all species with conspicuous petals or perianth segments (tepals), which would cover a broad swathe of families (he estimated three dozen across many orders). Other authors have defined it equally broadly as "having two whorls of tepals (sepals and petals) that are petal-like".

As Kron and Chase stated in 1995, this taxonomic unit had been in a considerable state of flux, with significant variation between the systems of Cronquist (1981), Thorne (1983, 1992), and Dahlgren (1985). When classification systems were based on morphological characters alone, lilioid species which clearly departed from the "lily" pattern were easily placed into separate families. For example, the Amaryllidaceae contained species whose flowers had six stamens and an inferior ovary. The Iridaceae contained those with three stamens and an inferior ovary. The remaining taxa were put together in a very broadly defined Liliaceae, usually referred to as Liliaceae sensu lato (s.l.). The Cronquist system's definition, for example, is the broadest of all. Rolf Dahlgren and colleagues were responsible for one of the most radical reorganisation of families, and in their 1985 monocot monograph defined the two orders (Asparagales and Liliales) which contain the bulk of monocot geophytes, as constituting the lilioid monocots.

The development of DNA sequencing and the use of genetic data in determining relationships between species of monocots confirmed what many taxonomists had long suspected: Liliaceae s.l. was highly polyphyletic. The family was demonstrated to include a significant number of unrelated groups, which belonged to quite separate families and even orders. For instance some genera such as Hyacinthus, previously placed in Liliaceae s.l., were reclassified in families within Asparagales (in this case Asparagaceae). In 1995 Chase et al. reviewed the understanding of the lilioids and equated them to Dahlgreen's Liliiflorae, which they designated as superorder Lilianae. They pointed out that the understanding of the phylogenetics of this group was critical for the establishment of a monocot classification. They also noted that while many authors treated this group as monophyletic (having a common ancestor), a closer reading of their texts revealed evidence of paraphyly (excluding some descendants of a common ancestor). For instance, Dahlgren had based monophyly on a single synapomorphy, that of a petaloid perianth, yet in discussing his Lilliflorae admitted it was undoubtedly paraphyletic. Dahlgren treated the monocots as split between ten superorders and placed five orders (Dioscoreales, Asparagales, Liliales, Melanthiales, Burmanniales and Orchidales) in his Liliiflorae.

Phylogenetic era 
In the 1995 study by Chase et al. referred to above, which was the largest yet to use purely molecular data, the results demonstrated paraphyly of the lilioids. However, because their data contradicted purely morphological phylogenies they were reluctant to draw definite conclusions as to the monophyly of this group. They identified four major clades of monocots. They named these alismatids, aroids, stemonoids and dioscoreoids, in addition to Acorus, and a core group of Asparagales, Liliales and commelinoids. They based the names of these groups on the closest corresponding superorders and orders of Dahlgren, with the exception of stemonoids (based on Stemonaceae for which there was no obvious equivalent).

There was no clear clade corresponding to Dahlgren's Liliiflorae, whose families were distributed amongst the aroids and dioscoreoids. Of Dahlgren's Liliiflorae, the Dioscoreales largely grouped into dioscoreoids, with the exception of Stemonaceae. The Asparagales formed two major groupings, which they labelled "higher" and "lower asparagoids", and included both the Iridaceae and Orchidaceae from Dahlgren's Liliales. On the other hand, a number of families from three other orders (Asparagales, Dioscoreales, Melanthiales) segregated together with the remaining Liliales families. Genera from Dahlgren's Melanthiales were found in both dioscoreoids and the redefined Liliales. Finally Dahlgren's Burmanniales were found to belong with the dioscoreoids. Some Asparagales taxa were also found amongst the commelinoids. The stemonoids were formed from Stemonaceae and other families from a variety of orders, including Pandanaceae (which alone formed Dahlgren's Pandaniflorae).

In an attempt to resolve the apparent differences between morphological and molecularly defined trees, a combined analysis was undertaken which confirmed superorder Liliiflorae as monophyletic, provided that a few modifications were undertaken. These included the removal of two tribes of Melanthiaceae (Melanthiales) and the inclusion of three additional families (Cyclanthaceae, Pandanaceae and Velloziaceae) from other superorders. This newly and more narrowly redefined Lilianae/Liliiflorae contained three orders, Asparagales, Liliales and Dioscoreales (which now included the stemonoids). This analysis also allowed for the establishment of a single synapomorphy, although this time by the presence of an inferior ovary. Significantly, the authors noted that it was no wonder the authors of angiosperm classifications had been exasperated by the Lilianae.

Angiosperm Phylogeny Group 
These findings, presented at the first Monocot Conference in 1993, with the addition of several studies that had become available in the interim, formed the basis of the 1998 consensus Angiosperm Phylogeny Group (APG) ordinal scheme. Among other things, the Alismatales were expanded and new orders such as Acorales (a placement for Acorus) and Pandanales (which now represented the stemonoids as well as new families) added. While not formally assigning any supraordinal ranks, the classification did recognize an informal grouping of monocot orders as the commelinoids. Otherwise the APG recognized only six monocot orders (Acorales, Alismatales, Asparagales, Dioscoreales, Liliales and Pandanales). The last four were however grouped together in the resulting cladogram and most closely represent the concept of lilioids, although this left some unplaced monocot families, including Corsiaceae and Petrosaviaceae.

Simultaneous with the release of the 1998 APG classification were two events: the publication of Kubitzki's major monograph on the monocots and the Second Monocot Conference. Kubitzki defined superorder Lilianae as all monocots except superorders Commelinae, Alismatanae and the Acoraceae, that is the four orders Asparagales, Liliales, Dioscoreales and Pandanales. The Monocot Conference devoted an entire section to Systematics of the Lilioids and included an update of their previous research by Chase and colleagues. On this occasion the latter felt that there was now enough data to put forward a definitive classification, defining the Lilioids as comprising the four orders placed in Lilianae by Kubitzki. Rudall and colleagues (2002) followed Chase (2000), in using the term "lilioid monocots" and again noting unresolved polytomy between these four orders and the remaining monocot clades (commelinids and Petrosaviaceae), although at that time the Petrosaviaceae were still unplaced.

There was now enough new data to justify revising the APG system, and a new classification was issued in 2003. Although this resulted in changes within the orders, it did not affect the relationship between them. Lilioid monocots were discussed but not formally recognized (commelinids, renamed from commelinoids, being the only supraordinal grouping in the monocots to be named) and Petrosaviaceae remained unplaced. The second version of the APG coincided with the third Monocot Conference (2003), the findings from which, using additional molecular markers, helped to resolve some of the remaining questions regarding relationships within this assemblage. Petrosaviaceae was shown to be included in what Chase refers to as "liliids" and placed in order Petrosaviales, while Dioscoreales and Pandanales were demonstrated to be sister clades. Rapid advances in understanding monocot relationships necessitated the release of another revision of the APG classification (2009), which incorporated these advances. Further definition of the relationships between lineages using multiple markers is continuing.

Textbooks and other sources produced in the last century are inevitably based on older classifications. Publications using versions of the APG system are now  appearing and the World Checklist of Selected Plant Families from the Royal Botanic Gardens, Kew now uses the APG III system, as does the Angiosperm Phylogeny Website and hence the classification of the lilioid monocots shown in the cladogram below. The Kew botanists treat the monocots as falling into three major groupings: alismatid monocots (Acorales, Alismatales), lilioid monocots (the five other non-commelinid monocots) and commelinid monocots. They also organize their monocot research into two teams I: Alismatids and Lilioids and II: Commelinids. A similar approach is taken by Judd in his Plant systematics.

Phylogeny and evolution 

The cladogram shown below displays the orders of Lilianae sensu Chase & Reveal (monocots) based on molecular phylogenetic evidence. Lilioid monocot orders are bracketed, namely Petrosaviales, Dioscoreales, Pandanales, Liliales and Asparagales. These constitute a paraphyletic assemblage, that is groups with a common ancestor that do not include all direct descendants (in this case commelinids which are a sister group to Asparagales); to form a clade, all the groups joined by thick lines would need to be included. While Acorales and Alismatales have been collectively referred to as "alismatid monocots", the remaining clades (lilioid and commelinid monocots) have been referred to as the "core monocots". The relationship between the orders (with the exception of the two sister orders) is pectinate, that is diverging in succession from the line that leads to the commelinids. Numbers indicate crown group (most recent common ancestor of the sampled species of the clade of interest) divergence times in mya (million years ago).

While this is the most commonly understood relationship, Davis et al. (2013) using a combination of plastid genomes have suggested that if Asparagales is treated sensu stricto  by excluding its largest and most atypical family, Orchidaceae then Aparagales sensu APG may not be monophyletic and that Orchidaceae and Liliales may be sister groups, and in turn are the sister of Asparagales. However, their data produced conflicting models. Zeng et al. (2014) using nuclear genes also found evidence for a sister relationship between Asparagales and Liliales. Although divergence time estimates within the lilioids have varied considerably, they were also able to obtain molecular clock estimates for the origin of the lilioids at approximately 125 mya (Cretaceous period). On the other hand, a large data set using a combined analysis of nuclear, mitochondrial and plastid genes together with nuclear phytochrome C was in agreement with the earlier APG relationships.

Subdivision 
Five orders make up the lilioid monocots.
 Petrosaviales Takht. (1997)
 Dioscoreales R.Br. (1835)
 Pandanales R.Br. ex Bercht. & J.Presl (1820)
 Liliales Perleb (1826)
 Asparagales Link 1829

See also 
 Lilianae
 List of systems of plant classification
 List of lilioid families

Notes

References

Bibliography 

Books
 
 
 
 
 
 
 
 
 

Symposia
 
 , see also excerpts in 
 
 

Chapters
 , in 
 , in 
 , in 
 , in 
 , in 
 , in 
 , in 
 , in 

Articles
 
 
 
 
 
 
 
 
 
 
 
 
 
 
 
 
 
 
 
 
 
 

APG
 
 
 

Websites
 
 
 
 
 

Monocots